Catadromus is a genus of beetles in the family of Carabidae, containing the following species:

 Catadromus australis Castelnau, 1834
 Catadromus cooki Giachino, 2005
 Catadromus goliath Tschitscherine, 1896
 Catadromus lacordairei Boisduval, 1835
 Catadromus simonae Dupuis, 1911
 Catadromus tenebrioides (Olivier, 1790)
 Catadromus tschitscherini Straneo, 1941

References

Pterostichinae